The QF 5.25-inch Mark I gun was the heaviest dual-purpose gun used by the Royal Navy during the Second World War.  Although considered less than completely successful, it saw extensive service. 267 guns were built.

Design 

Unlike its French and Italian contemporaries of similar size the QF 5.25-inch gun was designed as dual-purpose equipment capable of engaging both aircraft and surface targets.  Combining the secondary and heavy anti-aircraft armament allowed a significant weight savings for the s, which were designed to meet the Washington Naval Treaty limit of 35,000 tons. The gun fired an  shell, which was considered the largest that a gun crew could easily handle while still having the rate of fire needed for anti-aircraft use. In 1944, VT-fuzed shells became available, making the gun significantly more effective against aircraft.

The last five of the Dido class also known as the Bellona-class anti-aircraft cruisers mounted the 5.25-inch gun in the Remote Power Control RP10 Mk II mountings, which offered much-improved training and elevating speeds. The number of turrets on the Bellona class were reduced from five to four and the number of light AA guns were increased. The last of the Royal Navy's battleships which was commissioned after the war, had MK I turrets with enlarged gun houses compared to those fitted to the King George V and Dido-class ships, although the width between the guns remained the same. A slightly more powerful Mk II variant was also deployed by the British Army as an anti-aircraft and coast-defence gun.

Naval service 
The RN Gunnery Pocket Book published in 1945 states:

they fulfil the combined functions of H.A. Long Range Armament and Secondary Armament against surface craft. The 5.25 in. calibre with separate ammunition is used for dual High Angle and Low Angle Armament, since it gives the reasonable maximum weight of shell which can be loaded by the average gun's crew for sustained periods at all angles of elevation. The maximum rate of fire should be 10-12 rounds per minute.Sired, Enemy Engaged, p23, states: "The Italians did not press home their attacks very hard and I thought they had a lot to put up with, as each (10 × 5.25 in gun) cruiser could fire 100 rounds of 5.25" HE shell per minute..." Ronald Sired was a gunnery petty officer on board . The accuracy of Sired's account was praised by Captain FC Flynn RN. Official Historian of the Naval Campaigns in the Mediterranean

A wartime account describes  demonstration firing her main armament:

...the ship's company closed to action-stations and gave a demonstration of the cruiser's firepower to the army officers... in the form of a low angle barrage. Set to burst at 2000 yds range, a terrific barrage was put up for two minutes and we fired some two hundred rounds of 5.25-inch HE...A wall of bursting shell was thrown up just above sea level and I could see that the army officers were impressed...

The QF 5.25 guns performed well on  during Operation Halberd, escorting a convoy to Malta under, but later Prince of Wales was overwhelmed and sunk while operating along with Repulse when Force Z was attacked by Japanese aircraft, due to factors unrelated to the guns' performance. No Dido-class cruisers were lost to air attack, although four were sunk by submarine or surface-launched torpedoes. However , a Bellona-class cruiser (Improved Dido), was sunk at anchor in 1944 by a Luftwaffe guided missile. According to postwar publications the gunhouses were cramped, and the heavy projectile and cartridge cases resulted in a reduced sustained rate of fire to seven or eight rounds per minute rather than the designed twelve rounds per minute. However, these factors do not appear to have reduced Euryaluss rate of fire, over a one-minute period, which was typical for a World War II AA engagement. The dual-mount turrets 10 deg/s traversal speed was considered too slow to engage higher-speed aircraft at close range.

Ship classes 
Ships with QF 5.25 inch Mark I guns:
 s
 s

Land service 

In early 1942 the Governor of Gibraltar sought 5.25-in guns for dual anti-aircraft/coast defence role. None was forthcoming. However, later that year Anti-Aircraft Command in UK acquired three twin-gun turrets from the Admiralty, which were installed around London in permanent positions. Trials and use led the army to design a single gun mounting in two marks, both with an underground engine room to provide electrical and hydraulic power for traverse, elevation, fuze setting, ramming and other tasks. Fitted with the standard army Machine Fuze Setter No 10, these guns had a rate of fire of 10 rds/min and a maximum height of 50,000 ft, with an effective height of 36,000 ft. Mark 1A was a mild steel turret for anti-aircraft use only, Mk 1B was an armoured turret for anti aircraft and coast defence use. The gun was designated Mk 2.

By the end of 1943 only 16 of the new guns had been installed, far below projections. By the end of the war 164 guns had been produced. The high-explosive shells were fuzed with the standard army No 208 mechanical time fuze, used with 3.7 and 4.5-inch anti-aircraft guns. The guns remained in service after World War II, and in 1953 11 guns were installed in Gibraltar.

Late in World War II, seven guns were mounted in Australia and three in New Guinea, in enclosed single-gun anti-aircraft/coast defence turrets.

Specifications 
 Bore Diameter: 5.25 inches (133 mm)
 Barrel Length: 6.668 m (50 calibres)
 Shell weight: 80 lbs (36.3 kg)
 Range: 24,070 yds (22,000 m) at 45 degrees
 Anti Aircraft Ceiling: 46,500 ft (14,170 m)
 Rate of Fire: Sustained 7–8 rpm, 18 RPM claimed for HMS Vanguard.
 Penetration: side armour: 3 inches (76 mm) 9,500 yards (8,690 m) or 11,900 m, depending on the sources; the gun was not capable of penetrating 2 inches (51 mm) of deck armour at any range
 Mounting weight: 78.7 metric tons (varied)
 Mounting elevation: -5 to +70 degrees
 Training & elevating speeds: 10 degrees per second and 20 degrees per second respectively, in RP10 mounts.

Ammunition

Surviving examples 

 Princess Anne's Battery remains overlooking the sea at Gibraltar
 a turret originally from PNS Babur (ex ) is at the gate of Pakistan Navy Headquarters in Karachi

See also 
 List of naval guns

Weapons of comparable role, performance and era 
 12.8 cm FlaK 40, German heavy anti-aircraft gun firing lighter shell
 QF 4.5-inch naval gun, the Royal Navy's medium-calibre dual-purpose gun
 5"/38 caliber gun, the main US Navy dual-purpose gun during World War II
 Canon de 138 mm Modèle 1929, French naval gun of similar size
 135 mm /45 Italian naval gun, Italian naval gun of similar size

References

Notes

Citations

Bibliography 
 Brown, D.K.Nelson to Vanguard:  Warship Design and Development 1923–1945
 Campbell, John, British Naval Guns 1880–1945 No 14" article in "Warship Volume VIII
 DiGiulian, Tony, Nav Weaps page
 Garzke, William H., Jr.; Dulin, Robert O., Jr. (1980). British, Soviet, French, and Dutch Battleships of World War II. London: Jane's. .
 Hogg, Ian V. 1998. Allied Artillery of World War Two. The Crowood Press: London. 
 Horner, David, The Gunners – A History of Australian Artillery. Allen & Unwin: St Leonards. 
 Ireland, Bernard, Jane's Battleships of the 20th Century
 The Gunnery Pocket Book
 Routledge, Brigadier NW. 1994. History of the Royal Regiment of Artillery – Anti-Aircraft Artillery 1914–55. Brassey's: London. 
 Sired, Ronald ; edited by Flynn, F.C. 1957 Enemy engaged : a naval rating with the Mediterranean fleet, 1942–44 W. Kimber: London.

External links 

 Our Navy in Action; newsreel video of 5.25-inch guns engaging Axis aircraft and Italian battleships

 

Naval guns of the United Kingdom
World War II naval weapons of the United Kingdom
Naval anti-aircraft guns
133 mm artillery
Coastal artillery
Military equipment introduced in the 1930s